Zaid bin Hussein, GCVO, GBE (February 28, 1898 – October 18, 1970) was an Iraqi prince who was a member of the Hashemite dynasty and the head of the Royal House of Iraq from 1958 until his death, after the royal line founded by his brother Faisal I of Iraq died out.

Biography
Prince Zaid was the fourth son of Hussein bin Ali, who was the Sharif and Emir of Mecca, and only son of Hussein and his third wife, Adila Khanum. He was educated at Galatasaray High School in Stamboul (Istanbul), Constantinople College and Balliol College, Oxford.

From 1916 to 1919, Prince Zeid was the Commander of the Arab Northern Army. In 1918, T. E. Lawrence suggested that he be made king of a truncated north-western Syria. The advent of French rule resulted in his assignment in 1923 to the Iraqi Cavalry and he was promoted to Colonel.

Zeid was also Iraqi ambassador in Berlin and in Ankara in the 1930s and in London in the 1950s.

On July 14, 1958, Prince Zeid became Head of the Royal House of Iraq, following the assassination of his grand-nephew King Faisal II by General Muhammad Najib ar-Ruba'i, who proclaimed Iraq to be a republic. Zeid and his family continued to live in London, where the family resided during the coup, as Zeid was the Iraqi ambassador there.

Prince Zeid died in Paris on October 18, 1970, and was buried in the Royal Mausoleum at Raghdan Palace, Amman, Jordan. His son prince Ra'ad bin Zeid succeeded him as head of the Royal House of Iraq.

Marriage and children
In November 1933, Zeid married Princess Fahrelnissa Zeid in Athens, Greece. Together they had one son:

Prince Ra'ad bin Zeid - born February 18, 1936, married to Margaretha Inga Elisabeth Lind.

Ancestry

References

20th-century Iraqi people
1898 births
1970 deaths
Dhawu Awn
Alumni of Balliol College, Oxford
Ambassadors of Iraq to Germany
Ambassadors of Iraq to Turkey
Ambassadors of Iraq to the United Kingdom
Galatasaray High School alumni
Honorary Knights Grand Cross of the Order of the British Empire
Honorary Knights Grand Cross of the Royal Victorian Order
House of Hashim
Pretenders to the Iraqi throne
Princes of Iraq
Sons of kings